The 2021 Republic of Mordovia head election will take place on 17–19 September 2021, on common election day, coinciding with election to the State Duma. Acting Head Artyom Zdunov was elected for his first full term.

Background
Vladimir Volkov was the Head of the Republic of Mordovia since 2012, but he is a fixture in Mordovian politics after serving as Prime Minister of Mordovia in 1995–2012 under Nikolay Merkushkin. Volkov won his latest and only election in 2017 with 89.19% of the vote. On 18 November 2020 Vladimir Volkov asked Russian President Vladimir Putin about his retirement, and Putin appointed Artyom Zdunov as acting Head of Mordovia. Zdunov, an ethnic Mordvin, previously served as Prime Minister of Dagestan in 2018–2020 and Minister of Economy of Tatarstan in 2014–2018. Under Merkushkin and Volkov Mordovia was considered an "electoral sultanate" - a Russian region with high administrative control over voting process which results in consistent support for ruling United Russia, so the September head election is characterised as uncompetitive and predictable.

Candidates
Only political parties can nominate candidates for head election in Mordovia, self-nomination is not possible. However, candidate is not obliged to be a member of the nominating party. Candidate for Head of the Republic of Mordovia should be a Russian citizen and at least 30 years old. Candidates for Head should not have a foreign citizenship or residence permit. Each candidate in order to be registered is required to collect at least 7% of signatures of members and heads of municipalities (184–193 signatures). Also gubernatorial candidates present 3 candidacies to the Federation Council and election winner later appoints one of the presented candidates.

Registered candidates
Artyom Zdunov (United Russia), acting Head of the Republic of Mordovia, former Prime Minister of Dagestan (2018–2020)
Dmitry Kuzyakin (CPRF), Member of the State Duma, 2017 head candidate
Aleksandr Lemkin (RPPSS), pensioner
Yevgeny Tyurin (LDPR), Member of State Assembly of Mordovia, 2017 head candidate

Failed to qualify
Valery Bykov (SR-ZP), former Chief of regional Administration of Federal Migration Service (2010-2013)

Candidates for the Federation Council
Artyom Zdunov (United Russia):
Sergey Kislyak, incumbent Senator of the Federation Council
Igor Freydin, deputy general director for strategic development of LLP "Turboenergoremont"
Mikhail Sezganov, chief federal inspector for Mordovia
Dmitry Kuzyakin (CPRF):
Viktor Venchakov, chairman of regional Association of Law Enforcement Officers
Aleksey Savkin, director of LLP "SALANG"
Stanislav Marin, dermatovenerology doctor
Aleksandr Lemkin (RPPSS):
Ruslan Mukhaev, chairman of  public organization of small and medium enterprise "Opora Rossii" regional office
Aleksey Polozov, chairman of Saransk Proletarsky District Veterans' Organisation
Yevgeny Yachinov, chairman of Saransk Mechanical Plant labour union
Yevgeny Tyurin (LDPR):
Aleksey Zakhryapin, member of Saransk Council of Deputies
Pavel Fominov, individual entrepreneur
Anatoly Vakhterov, lawyer

Finances
All sums are in rubles.

Results

|- style="background-color:#E9E9E9;text-align:center;"
! style="text-align:left;" colspan=2| Candidate
! style="text-align:left;"| Party
! width="75"|Votes
! width="30"|%
|-
| style="background-color:;"|
| style="text-align:left;"| Artyom Zdunov (incumbent)
| style="text-align:left;"| United Russia
| 298,571
| 78.26
|-
| style="background-color:;"|
| style="text-align:left;"| Dmitry Kuzyakin
| style="text-align:left;"| Communist Party
| 43,801
| 11.48
|-
| style="background-color:;"|
| style="text-align:left;"| Yevgeny Tyurin
| style="text-align:left;"| Liberal Democratic Party
| 23,688
| 6.21
|-
| style="background-color:|
| style="text-align:left;"| Aleksandr Lemkin
| style="text-align:left;"| Party of Pensioners
| 10,081
| 2.64
|-
| style="text-align:left;" colspan="3"| Valid votes
| 376,141
| 98.59
|-
| style="text-align:left;" colspan="3"| Blank ballots
| 5,371
| 1.41
|- style="font-weight:bold"
| style="text-align:left;" colspan="3"| Total
| 381,512
| 100.00
|-
| style="background-color:#E9E9E9;" colspan="6"|
|-
| style="text-align:left;" colspan="3"| Turnout
| 381,512
| 64.80
|-
| style="text-align:left;" colspan="3"| Registered voters
| 588,731
| 100.00
|-
| colspan="5" style="background-color:#E9E9E9;"|
|- style="font-weight:bold"
| colspan="4" |Source:
|
|}

Incumbent Senator Sergey Kislyak (Independent) was re-appointed to the Federation Council.

References

Mordovia
September 2021 events in Russia
Politics of Mordovia